Brigid Brannagh (born August 3, 1972) is an American actress. She has been credited as Brigid Brannagh, Brigid Brannah, Brigid Brannaugh, Brigid Walsh, and Brigid Conley Walsh.

Early life and education
Born in San Francisco, California, Brannagh is of Irish ancestry. She is the fourth child of nine children. She began auditioning for roles around age 13.

Career
She is a frequent guest star on various television programs, including a recurring role on CSI: Crime Scene Investigation, playing serial felon Tammy Felton in the first and second seasons. She starred in Kindred: The Embraced and Over There. She also had the recurring role of Virginia Bryce, Wesley Wyndam-Pryce's girlfriend, during the second season of Angel.

In 1999, Brannagh guest starred on a season 2 episode of the TV series Charmed ("That Old Black Magic") as an evil witch named Tuatha.

In 1991 and 1992 she was featured in the Fox sitcom True Colors about an interracial family.

In 2003 Brannagh played the part of "Ruby" in the Star Trek: Enterprise episode "First Flight".

In 2007, she landed a role in the Lifetime series Army Wives, in which she portrayed Pamela Moran for six seasons until Spring 2012.

She starred in Hallmark movie Crush on You, which aired in June 2011 and in independent movie Not That Funny.

Soon after leaving Army Wives, Brannagh joined the cast of the proposed ABC drama series Gilded Lillys as Elizabeth, the matriarch of the Lily family. The show began filming in March 2012 in Boston after being ordered in late January. Gilded Lillys was created and produced by Shonda Rhimes. However, ABC did not pick up the series.

From 2017 to 2019 Brannagh portrayed Stacey Yorkes in the Hulu television series Runaways.

Filmography

Film

Television

References

External links
 
 

1972 births
American film actresses
American television actresses
American people of Irish descent
Living people
Actresses from San Francisco
20th-century American actresses
21st-century American actresses